The Câmpea (also: Câmpina, Câmpinița) is a left tributary of the river Prahova in Romania. It flows into the Prahova near the city Câmpina.

References

Rivers of Romania
Rivers of Prahova County